Tracy Rides is a 1935 American Western film directed by Harry S. Webb and starring Tom Tyler, Virginia Brown Faire and Edmund Cobb.

Main cast
 Tom Tyler as Sheriff Tom Tracy  
 Virginia Brown Faire as Molly Hampton  
 Edmund Cobb as Ned Hampton  
 Charles K. French as John Hampton  
 Carol Shandrew as Judy Green  
 Lafe McKee as Jim Green  
 Jimmy Aubrey as Sandy, the Cook

References

Bibliography
 Pitts, Michael R. Poverty Row Studios, 1929–1940: An Illustrated History of 55 Independent Film Companies, with a Filmography for Each. McFarland & Company, 2005.

External links
 

1935 films
1935 Western (genre) films
1930s English-language films
American Western (genre) films
Films directed by Harry S. Webb
Reliable Pictures films
American black-and-white films
1930s American films